Orlanda Maria Duarte Santos Ferreira is a former member of the Pan-African Parliament from Cape Verde. She is a member of the ECOWAS Parliament.

References

Year of birth missing (living people)
Living people
Members of the Pan-African Parliament from Cape Verde
21st-century women politicians
Cape Verdean women in politics
Women members of the Pan-African Parliament